Bliss Gate is a small village in Worcestershire, England. It had many attractive tourist landmarks such as the Bliss Gate Inn (now closed) and a village board for Rock village.

Villages in Worcestershire